Amir Sedighi (born July 16, 1993) is an Iranian professional basketball player. He currently plays for Mahram Tehran in the Iranian Super League as well as for the Iranian national basketball team, as a forward. He is 6'8" in height.
He was a member of Iran national youth team attending in 2010 Summer Youth Olympics. Iran finally ranked 12th among 20 teams. Memi Bečirovič introduced him to national team for the first time in 2012 FIBA Asia Cup.

References

External links
 Profile at iranbasketball.org
 
 
 

Iranian men's basketball players
1993 births
Living people
Basketball players at the 2010 Summer Youth Olympics
Mahram Tehran BC players
Small forwards
Power forwards (basketball)
People from Varamin